Itacarambi is a municipality in the north of the state of Minas Gerais in Brazil.   the population was 18,164 in an area of 1,252 km².  
The elevation of the municipal seat is 445 meters.  
It became a municipality in 1962.  
The postal code (CEP) is 39470-000.
Statistical microregion:  Januária

Icaraí de Minas is on the left bank of the São Francisco River between Januária and Manga. It is connected to Januária by paved BR-135.  The distance is 63 km.

The economy is based on agriculture with emphasis on cattle raising.  There were 39,000 head in 2006.  The main agricultural crops were corn, manioc, sugarcane, and mamona—castor oil plant.  The GDP was R$65,000,000 in 2005.

Municipal Human Development Index: .622 (2000)
State ranking: 801 out of 853 municipalities 
National ranking: 4,267 out of 5,138 municipalities 
(For the complete list see Frigoletto)

References

IBGE

See also
List of municipalities in Minas Gerais

Municipalities in Minas Gerais